The Sun Fast 32 is a French sailboat that was designed by Philippe Briand as a cruiser-racer and first built in 1993.

The Sun Fast 32 is part of the Sun Fast sailboat range.

The design was developed into the Sun Odyssey 32.1 cruiser in 1994.

Production
The design was built by Jeanneau in France, from 1993 to 2001 with 100 boats completed, but it is now out of production.

Design
The Sun Fast 32 is a recreational keelboat, built predominantly of fiberglass, with wood trim. It has a fractional sloop rig, with a deck-stepped mast, two sets of swept spreaders and aluminum spars with continuous stainless steel wire rigging. The hull has a raked stem, a reverse transom with steps, an internally mounted spade-type rudder controlled by a tiller and a fixed deep draft, "L"-shaped, fin keel or optional shoal-draft keel. The deep draft fin keel model displaces  and carries  of cast iron ballast, while the shoal draft version displaces  and carries  of cast iron ballast.

The design has sleeping accommodation for six people, with a double "V"-berth in the bow cabin, two straight settees in the main cabin and an aft cabin with a double berth on the port side. The galley is located on the port side just forward of the companionway ladder. The galley is "L"-shaped and is equipped with a two-burner stove, an ice box and a sink. A navigation station is opposite the galley, on the starboard side. The head is located just aft of the companionway on the starboard side and includes a shower. The interior has a teak sole and varnished makore woodwork.

Operational history
The boat was at one time supported by a class club that organized racing events, the Sun Fast Association.

See also
List of sailing boat types

References

External links

Keelboats
1990s sailboat type designs
Sailing yachts
Sailboat type designs by Philippe Briand
Sailboat types built by Jeanneau